Defending champions Thelma Coyne and Nancye Wynne defeated Nell Hopman and Emily Hood Westacott 6–2, 6–2 in the final, to win the women's doubles tennis title at the 1937 Australian Championships.

Seeds

  Thelma Coyne /  Nancye Wynne (champions)
  Nell Hopman /  Emily Hood Westacott (final)
  May Blick /  Joan Hartigan (semifinals)
  Alison Hattersley /  Vera Selwin (semifinals)

Draw

Draw

Notes

References

External links
  Source for seedings and the draw

1937 in Australian tennis
1937 in women's tennis
1937 in Australian women's sport
Women's Doubles